The Constitution of the Serbian Orthodox Church is a ecclesiastical legal act in Serbian Orthodox Church.

History 
The first and only Constitution of the Serbian Orthodox Church was adopted 16. November 1931.  Two years earlier, the Law on the Serbian Orthodox Church was adopted.  Also, the election of the Serbian patriarch was prescribed by the state Law on the Election of the Patriarch of the Serbian Orthodox Church. 

Two years after the end of  World War II, and after changes in the Church's relations with the state, the Holy Synod of Bishops of the Serbian Orthodox Church made amendments to the Constitution, promulgated for the first time in "Glasnik", the official newspaper of the Serbian Patriarchate. The second edition of the Constitution was promulgated in 1957. 

Since then, the Constitution has been amended several times by constitutional decisions Holy Synod of Bishops in order to achieve the mission of the Church as successfully as possible. Namely, the church constitution should not be equated with the state constitution and defined as the highest general legal act in the Church. The Holy Synod of Bishops makes decisions in organizational terms, and any such decision automatically means an amendment to the current Constitution. Even a two-thirds majority is not needed to make such decisions. On 2 July 2012 a constitutive session of the Commission of the Holy Synod of Bishops for the revision of the Constitution of the Serbian Orthodox Church was held, which was formed 16 June 2011. It was headed by the Metropolitan of Montenegro and the Littoral Amfilohije as President. Its task is to collect and systematize all the decisions of the Holy Synod of Bishops of the constitutional character from the previous period in order to be adequately included in the new Constitution.

In addition to the Constitution of the Serbian Orthodox Church within the Serbian Orthodox Church itself there are other general ecclesiastical acts which, based on canonical tradition, regulate internal organizational of Serbian Orthodox Dioceses around the world.

Regulations 

According to the Constitution, ecclesiastical authority is spiritual, ecclesiastical-disciplinary and ecclesiastical-judicial, and canonically belongs only to the hierarchy. Hierarchy exercises ecclesiastical authority through its representatives and bodies. Bishop The government in the community with the clergy and the people through its representatives and bodies, regulates and manages property, endowment (foundation), fund, as well as other matters provided by the Constitution.

The Constitution stipulates that the structure of the Serbian Orthodox Church is church-hierarchical and church-self-governing. There are the following church authorities, bodies and organs: 

 Patriarch, Holy Synod of Bishops, Great church court, Patriarchal Board of Directors;
 Diocesan Archbishop, Diocesan Ecclesiastical Court, Diocesan Council, Diocesan Board of Directors;
 Archbishop's vicar;
 Parish;
 Church-municipal council, church-municipal board of directors;
 Abbot and fraternity of the monastery.

Serbian Orthodox Church is episcopal, its main administrative division is diocese both in church-hierarchical and church-self-governing terms. Dioceses are further divided into Archdiocese, each of which consists of several church communities and parishes. The parish is the smallest unit in the church organization. It is a community of believers that gathers at the holy liturgy led by the parish priest.

See also 

 Serbian Orthodox Church

Sources 

Serbian Orthodox Church